Mark Ezekiel Maglasang (born June 13, 1995), known professionally as Honcho (formerly Bosx1ne), is a Filipino rapper and songwriter known for founding the hip-hop group Ex Battalion, whose collective gained nationwide prominence with hits such as "Hayaan Mo Sila" and "No Games", the only trap tracks that charted the Top 10 of the now-defunct Billboard PH Top 20.

Career
Bosx1ne founded Ex Battalion who gained nationwide fame in 2018 after the release of "Hayaan Mo Sila", he changed his screen name to Honcho in mid-2020. 

In April 2021, Honcho announced a lenten special EP entitled "Rosario", which he would be releasing on YouTube on a one-track-a-day arrangement from April 1 to 4, starting with the first song entitled "Ulap" featuring Jekkpot, Brando, and MC Einstein, and finally ending with the titular song itself.

In August 2022, Honcho apparently was "kicked out" of Ex Battalion after an alleged altercation with Skusta Clee, according to a cryptic post by the latter indicating Honcho has left the group.

See also
 Filipino hip hop

References

1995 births
Living people
Cebuano people
21st-century Filipino male singers
Filipino rappers
Filipino singer-songwriters
Musicians from Cebu
People from Cebu
Singers from Cebu
Universal Records (Philippines) artists
Visayan people
Ex Battalion members